The River Heights Sinclair Station, at 594 S. 400 East in River Heights, Utah, was listed on the National Register of Historic Places in 2017.

It was renovated in the fall of 2016 and opened as a photography studio named Station Studio at the beginning of 2017.

See also
List of historic filling stations

References

Transportation buildings and structures on the National Register of Historic Places in Utah
National Register of Historic Places in Cache County, Utah
Buildings and structures completed in 1935